Lucien Barrière (14 January 1923 – 17 September 1990) was a French entrepreneur and businessman. He was the heir and founder of the Lucien Barrière group, one of the largest group of casinos, luxury hotels, resorts and restaurants.

Biography

He was born in the French Ardèche region from a modest, goat raising family.

In 1962, he was chosen by his uncle François André, who had no direct descendants, to succeed him as head of several successful companies specializing in the operation of casinos and luxury hotels. The casinos of Deauville, Cannes and La Baule and the hotels Normandy Barriere, Royal Barriere and the Hotel du Golf Barriere de Deauville were among the best known assets of the company.

In 1959, he became the general manager of the group. For thirty years he developed the successful Barriere empire following the same policy as his predecessor: luxury, sophistication, perfection, elegance, refinement, friendliness and cultivating the French joie de vivre.

He married Martha Szentgyörgyi (died 11 October 2008), a Hungarian dancer. Martha had a daughter from a previous marriage, Diane, born in 1957, which he adopted and raised as his own. He taught her the know-how of the trade, before designating her as the sole heir of his luxury empire.

In 1962, he founded the Lucien Barrière group, one of the first French companies charged with managing casinos and luxury hotels.

In 1975, Lucien Barrière sponsored the creation of the Deauville American Film Festival, alongside the major proponents of this idea, the Mayor of Deauville Michel d'Ornano, André Halimi and Lionel Shushan.

In 1990, he died at Caen University Hospital of cardiac arrest at the age of 67, following complications resulting from a coronary angioplasty carried out by Professor Grollier. Diane, married to the notary Dominique Desseigne, succeeded her adoptive father as head of the group and pursued the same successful policy as her predecessors. In July 1995 she was the victim of a serious plane crash that left her quadriplegic, and later died in May 2001 at 44 years.

References

1923 births
1990 deaths
20th-century French businesspeople
French company founders
People from Ardèche